Trimeric intracellular cation-selective channel A (TRIC-A) is a monovalent cation channel in the SR and nuclear membranes of skeletal muscle cells, encoded by the transmembrane protein 38A (TMEM38A) gene. It is one of two known TRIC proteins, the other being TRIC-B.

Structure
TRIC-A is a 33kDa transmembrane protein, expressed predominantly in excitable tissues including skeletal muscle and brain. Its N-terminal region is located in the SR lumen or within the nucleus while its C-terminal region projects into the cytoplasm. In situ, TRIC-A forms homo-trimers, producing its "bullet-shaped" three-dimensional structure (see Venturi et al. (2012), Figure 1 for a three-dimensional rendering of TRIC-A).

Function
TRIC-A is permeable to both Na+ and K+ but not divalent cations like Ca2+. The channel exhibits marked voltage-dependence, becoming more open when the cytosol is more positively charged than the ER lumen. TMEM38A-knockout mice exhibit reduced Ryanodine receptor 1-mediated Ca2+ release; as such, K+ flux into the SR through TRIC-A is thought to support RyR1-mediated efflux of Ca2+ ions from the sarcoplasmic reticulum into the cytosol. These knockouts also develop hypertension during early adulthood, whereas transgenic mice overexpressing TRIC-A develop hypotension. These results are thought to reflect a role for TRIC-A in the excitability of vascular smooth muscle cells.

Clinical significance
TRIC-A has been implicated in the regulation of arterial blood pressure through regulating the excitability of vascular smooth muscle cells. Several single-nucleotide polymorphisms (SNPs) in close proximity to the TRIC-A locus increase the risk of hypertension and reduce the efficiency of antihypertensive drugs in its treatment. Such SNPs are in positive linkage disequilibrium with TRIC-A, meaning they are unlikely to be separated by genetic recombination and so are more frequently inherited together from the same parent chromosome. As such, TRIC-A SNPs can provide biomarkers for the diagnosis of essential hypertension and, in future, may help to determine which treatments may be most well-suited to a given individual (see personalized medicine).

See also
TMEM38B
Trimeric intracellular cation-selective channel

References